Big Cypress Creek is an  river in Texas. It is part of the Red River watershed, with its water eventually flowing to the Atchafalaya River through the Atchafalaya Basin and entering the Gulf of Mexico.

It turns south and becomes impounded as the Lake O' the Pines, which occupies the lowest  of the stream's course, primarily in Marion County. Below the reservoir, the creek becomes known as Big Cypress Bayou, which continues east to Caddo Lake and into Louisiana.

See also
List of rivers of Texas

References

USGS Hydrologic Unit Map - State of Texas (1974)

Rivers of Texas
Tributaries of the Red River of the South
Rivers of Franklin County, Texas
Rivers of Titus County, Texas
Rivers of Camp County, Texas
Rivers of Marion County, Texas